Francis Edward Watson (9 August 1860 – 27 October 1930) was a New Zealand cricketer and schoolteacher.

The son of a clergyman, Watson was born on a ship in the bay at Saint Helena. He grew up in India before his family moved to Tasmania. He moved to New Zealand, where he worked as a schoolteacher, becoming headmaster of the Campbell Street School in Palmerston North.

He played only a single match at first-class level, representing a combined "West Coast" team, which consisted of players from the western regions of New Zealand's North Island. In the match, against Wellington at the Basin Reserve in December 1879, Watson batted third in the West Coast first innings, scoring six runs. Although his team eventually the match by six wickets, he did not bat a second time.

In retirement, Watson settled in Te Puke, in the Bay of Plenty, dying there in October 1930. His older brother, George Watson, was also a cricketer, and played several matches for Canterbury.

References

External links
 Francis Watson profile and statistics at CricketArchive

1860 births
1930 deaths
New Zealand cricketers
West Coast cricketers
Australian emigrants to New Zealand